Kannada  may refer to:

 Kannada language, one of the major Dravidian languages of India
 Kannada dialects
 Kannada cinema
 Kannada people, the native speakers of Kannada
 Kannada (Unicode block)
 Kannada Wikipedia
 Kannada grammar
 Kannada literature
 Kannada poetry
 Kannada script
 Kannada alphabet
 Karnataka
 Kannada University

See also
 Canada (disambiguation)
 Kanada (disambiguation)
 Kaneda, a Japanese surname

Language and nationality disambiguation pages